Francisco Xavier Salazar Diez de Sollano (born 3 May 1968) was the Chair of the Mexican Energy Regulatory Commission (CRE)  from 2005 to 2015. He also chaired the Ibero-american Association of Energy Regulators (ARIAE)  from 2011 to 2105. He is currently the Chair of Mexico's National Committee of the World Energy Council . Prior to being the Chair of the CRE, he served as Deputy of the LVII and LIX Legislatures of the Mexican Congress, where he chaired the Energy Committee.

He is considered as one of the architects of Mexico's energy reform.

He is son of Francisco Xavier Salazar Saenz, a former Senator and former Secretary of Labor.

References

1968 births
Living people
People from San Luis Potosí City
Members of the Chamber of Deputies (Mexico)
National Action Party (Mexico) politicians
Deputies of the LVII Legislature of Mexico
Deputies of the LIX Legislature of Mexico